George Edgar Ohr (July 12, 1857 – April 7, 1918) was an American ceramic artist and the self-proclaimed "Mad Potter of Biloxi" in Mississippi. In recognition of his innovative experimentation with modern clay forms from 1880 to 1910, some consider him a precursor to the American Abstract-Expressionism movement.

Personal life
George Ohr was born in Biloxi, Mississippi, on July 12, 1857. He was the son of German immigrants who arrived in New Orleans c. 1850 and subsequently married and moved to Biloxi. George Ohr tried his hand at various trades before he became interested in ceramics in 1879, while an apprentice of Joseph Fortune Meyer. Ohr married Josephine Gehring of New Orleans on September 15, 1886. Ten children were born to the Ohrs, but only 6 survived to adulthood. George Ohr died of throat cancer on April 7, 1918.

Ohr studied the potter's trade with Joseph Meyer in New Orleans, a potter whose family hailed from Alsace-Lorraine, as did Ohr's.  Ohr's father had established the first blacksmith shop in Biloxi and his mother ran an early, popular grocery store there. In his lifetime, Ohr claimed to have made over 20,000 ceramic pieces. He called his work "unequaled, undisputed, unrivaled." In 1884, Ohr exhibited and sold his pottery at the World's Industrial and Cotton Centennial Exposition in New Orleans. Of the hundreds of pieces he showed, Ohr boasted he showed "no two alike."

The 1894 fire that burned most of Biloxi also destroyed Ohr's workshop, and it has been noted that Ohr's post-fire works show tremendous "energy" and "fluidity." George Ohr called his pots "mud babies". Upon the destruction of his workshop and his work, he gathered the pieces that survived the fire, and although burned, he kept each piece, calling them his " burned babies".

Work

Ohr died largely unknown in 1918. For decades, his pots sat in a garage behind his sons' gas station in Biloxi. Ohr's work is now seen as ground-breaking and a harbinger of the abstract sculpture and pottery that developed in the mid-20th century; his pieces are now relatively rare and highly coveted.

A notable feature of Ohr's pottery is its thin walls, metallic glazes, and twisted, pinched shapes; to this day, few potters have been able to replicate them using a pottery wheel, which is how Ohr made his works. Ohr dug much of his clay locally in southern Mississippi from the Tchoutacabouffa River.  Tchoutacabouffa is the Biloxi tribe's word for "broken pot."

He called himself the "Mad Potter of Biloxi", groomed himself eccentrically, and inscribed this bawdy poem on the side of some of his pots: "Molly and I were on the beach engaged in nature's folly, The sand was hot upon my back but the sun was hot to Molly."

Ohr-O'Keefe Museum of Art

The Ohr-O'Keefe Museum Of Art in Biloxi has a large permanent collection of Ohr's work. Three buildings of the new campus designed by Frank Gehry opened to the public on November 8, 2010, with several exhibitions, including a large selection of work by George Ohr. In addition to the Gehry-designed buildings, the Pleasant Reed Interpretive Center is also open to the public.

The museum campus was almost partially destroyed during Hurricane Katrina when a casino barge was washed onto a nearby estate. Visitors can view the construction that is planned to continue on the western part of the campus, beginning with the Center for Ceramics building, followed by the George E. Ohr "Pods," scheduled to be completed in 2012.

From 2007 to 2010 Ohr Rising:  The Emergence of an American Master, a major national exhibition of Ohr pottery, traveled to Pomona, California; San Angelo, Texas; Alfred, New York; Toronto, Canada; and the Louisiana State University Museum of Art in Baton Rouge, Louisiana.  Many of those pieces, as well as several that have never been displayed, can now be seen at the Ohr-O'Keefe Museum of Art.

Two new Frank-Gehry designed buildings are scheduled to open in 2012.  The City of Biloxi Center for Ceramics will open in late spring/early summer 2012 and will be used for classes in ceramics and other art.  The Center for Ceramics will also contain community meeting areas.

References

Further reading

External links
George E. Ohr  at the Ohr–O'Keefe Museum of Art

1857 births
1918 deaths
American ceramists
American potters
Deaths from cancer in Mississippi